Nurar is a town and union council in Bannu District of Khyber-Pakhtunkhwa. It is located at 32°54'9N 70°32'3E and has an altitude of 345 metres (1135 feet).

References

Union councils of Bannu District
Populated places in Bannu District